James Edwin Campbell may refer to:
James E. Campbell (1843–1924), Democratic politician and Governor of Ohio
James Edwin Campbell (poet) (1867–1896), African American poet, editor, writer and educator

See also
James Campbell (disambiguation)